Francis Savage (1769 – 19 September 1823) was an Irish politician. He was the eldest son of Charles Savage of Ardkeen and educated at Trinity College, Dublin.

He was appointed Sheriff of County Down for 1791-92 and 1819-20. He was elected Member of Parliament for County Down in the Parliament of Ireland, 1794–1800 and for County Down in the United Kingdom Parliament, 1801–1812.

References

Irish MPs 1790–1797
Irish MPs 1798–1800
UK MPs 1801–1802
UK MPs 1802–1806
UK MPs 1806–1807
UK MPs 1807–1812
Members of the Parliament of the United Kingdom for County Down constituencies (1801–1922)
High Sheriffs of Down
1769 births
1823 deaths
Alumni of Trinity College Dublin
Members of the Parliament of Ireland (pre-1801) for County Down constituencies